Jakob Meerits (born 1882 Pangodi Parish, Tartu County) was an Estonian politician. He was a member of I Riigikogu. On 7 March 1923, he resigned his position and he was replaced by Vladimir Binsol.

References

1882 births
Year of death missing
Members of the Riigikogu, 1920–1923